Jan E. Conn (born 1952) is a Canadian geneticist and poet. She resides in Great Barrington, Massachusetts where she does research on mosquito genetics at the Wadsworth Center, Division of Infectious Diseases, New York State Department of Health in Albany, New York. She has also written six books of poetry.

Biography
Conn was born in Asbestos, Quebec and moved to Montreal at the age of 17. She received her Ph.D. in genetics from the University of Toronto in 1987. She has traveled to Guatemala, Venezuela, Florida, Vermont and Massachusetts, conducting research on insects that transmit pathogens. Before taking up her current work on population genetics of malaria-carrying mosquitoes in South America and Africa, she was a recognized expert on the genetics of Black fly (Simulium) species vectoring river blindness (onchocerciasis) in Central America.

Poetry
Conn has written six books of poetry, including Jaguar Rain: the Margaret Mee poems, inspired by the diaries and botanical art of Margaret Mee. She has won numerous awards and major travel grants related to poetry.  Her book South of the Tudo Bem Cafe, 1990, was shortlisted for the Pat Lowther Award.

Bibliography
Red Shoes in the Rain - 1980
The Fabulous Disguise of Ourselves - 1986
South of the Tudo Bem Cafe - 1992
What Dante Did With Loss - 1996
Beauties on Mad River - 2000
Jaguar Rain: the Margaret Mee poems - 2006

See also

List of Canadian poets
List of Canadian writers

References

External links
 Jan Conn poetry homepage.

1952 births
Living people
Canadian geneticists
Canadian women geneticists
20th-century Canadian poets
21st-century Canadian poets
Canadian women poets
People from Val-des-Sources
University of Toronto alumni
20th-century Canadian women writers
21st-century Canadian women writers
20th-century Canadian women scientists
21st-century Canadian women scientists